The 1994 Philadelphia Wings season marked the team's eighth season of operation.

Game log
Reference:

(p) - denotes playoff game

Roster
Reference:

See also
 Philadelphia Wings
 1994 MILL season

References

External links
 Wingszone Season Archive

Philadelphia Wings seasons
Philly
1994 in lacrosse